Sister San Sulpicio (Spanish:La hermana San Sulpicio) may refer to:

 Sister San Sulpicio (novel), an 1889 novel by Armando Palacio Valdés
 Sister San Sulpicio (1927 film), a silent film directed by Florián Rey 
 Sister San Sulpicio (1934 film), a sound film directed by Florián Rey 
 Sister San Sulpicio (1952 film), a sound film directed by Luis Lucia

See also
 The Rebellious Novice, a 1971 musical film adaptation
 Saint-Sulpice (disambiguation)
 Sulpicio (disambiguation)